The Atlantic Coast Line Railroad was a US Class I railroad from 1900 until 1967. The following former and active train stations were previously used by the Atlantic Coast Line Railroad. Many of them are listed on the National Register of Historic Places.

Florida
 Bostwick station
 Bradenton station
 Brooksville station
 Chiefland station
 Clearwater station (Atlantic Coast Line)
 Crystal River station
 Dade City Atlantic Coast Line Railroad Depot, listed on the NRHP in Florida
 DeLand station
 Doctors Lake station
 Dunedin station
 Old Dundee Atlantic Coast Line Railroad Depot
 Dunnellon Atlantic Coast Line Railroad Depot (part of the Dunnellon Boomtown Historic District)
 Green Cove Springs station
 Haines City station
 High Springs station—This was the southern end of the Jacksonville Southwestern Railroad (JSW), operated by Cummer Cypress in Jacksonville, major shops and yards were maintained in High Springs, The JSW was purchased by the ACL, Florida Railroad Commission approved the purchase on July 28, 1904.)
 Inverness station (Florida)
 Old Gainesville Depot—Now part of Santa Fe College
 Jacksonville
 Catherine Street Station—This station was owned and operated by the Jacksonville Southwestern and purchased with that property, The Florida Railroad Commission approved the purchase on July 28, 1904. The daily Passenger trains continued to use the Catherine Street station for some time after the purchase for the benefit of Cummer Cypress employees) 
 Jacksonville station (Atlantic Coast Line Freight Depot)—The freight station was owned and operated by the Atlantic and East Coast Terminal Company which was jointly owned by the Atlantic Coast Line and the Florida East Coast railroads)
 Prime F. Osborn III Convention Center (Union Terminal Station) -- The Jacksonville Terminal Company was jointly owned by the Atlantic Coast Line, Seaboard Air Line, Georgia Southern and Florida and the Florida East Coast railroads) "Once we leave Washington D.C. we see no more of that kind of railroading until we reach Jacksonville Terminal
 Yukon station (Florida)—Pete Rood was the last active Agent, depot was moved then razed in 2014
 Kissimmee station
 Lacoochee station
 Lady Lake station
 Old Lake Placid Atlantic Coast Line Railroad Depot
 Atlantic Coast Line Railroad Depot (Lake Wales, Florida), listed on the NRHP in Florida
 Lakeland station
 Largo station
 Union Depot and Atlantic Coast Line Freight Station, Live Oak, listed on the NRHP in Florida
 McIntosh station
 Magnolia Springs station
 Old Mount Dora Atlantic Coast Line Railroad Station
 Ocala Union Station
 Orange Park station
 Orlando
 Church Street Station (Orlando) until 1926
 Orlando Health/Amtrak station
 Palatka station
 Pinellas Park station
 Plant City Union Depot
 Punta Gorda Atlantic Coast Line Depot, listed on the NRHP in Florida
 Quitman station
 Russell station
 St. Petersburg station (Amtrak)
 San Antonio station (Florida)
 Sanford (Atlantic Coast Line)
 Atlantic Coast Line Passenger Depot (Sarasota, Florida), listed on the NRHP in Florida
 Tampa Union Station—Was jointly owned by the Atlantic Coast Line, Seaboard Air Line and the Tampa Northern railroads
 Tarpon Springs Depot
 Tavares station
 Trenton Depot
 Trilby station—Became the second largest railroad center in Florida, phased out in favor of the former Seaboard Air Line route after their merger, hardly a trace of Trilby's railroad heritage remains.
 Umatilla station (Florida)
 West Palm Beach station (Atlantic Coast Line)
 Williston station (Florida)
 Winter Park station
 Zephyrhills station

Georgia
 Alma station (Georgia)
 Heritage Plaza (Albany, Georgia)
 Jesup station
 Savannah station (Amtrak)

North Carolina
 Atkinson station (North Carolina)
 Aulander station
 Ayden station
 Battleboro station
 Beard station
 Benson, NC station
 Bethel station (North Carolina)
 Bowdens station
 Buie station
 Bunn station
 Burgaw Depot
 Calypso station
 Castle Hayne station
 Clinton Depot
 Chadbourn station
 Conetoe station
 Delco station
 Dunn station
 Elm City station
 Enfield station (North Carolina)
 Evergreen station (North Carolina)
 Fairmont station (North Carolina)
 Fair Bluff station
 Fayetteville (Amtrak station), listed on the NRHP in North Carolina
 Four Oaks, NC station
 Garland station (North Carolina)
 Goldsboro Union Station
 Grifton station
 Halifax, NC station
 House station (North Carolina)
 Hope Mills station
 Kenly station (North Carolina)
 Lake Waccamaw Depot
 Lucama station
 Maxton station
 Maysville station (North Carolina)
 Milan station 
 Morvern station
 Mt. Olive (North Carolina)
 Nashville station (North Carolina)
 New Bern station
 Orrum station
 Pactolus station
 Parkersburg station (North Carolina)
 Parkton station (North Carolina)
 Parmele station
 Pembroke station
 Plymouth station (North Carolina)
 Pollocksville station
 Proctorville station (North Carolina)
 Rennert station
 Robersonville station
 Rocky Mount (Amtrak station)
 Roduco station
 Roseboro station (North Carolina)
 Rowland Depot
 Sanford station (Atlantic Coast Line)
 Scotland Neck station
 Selma Union Depot
 Sharpsburg station (North Carolina)
 Smithfield station
 Speed station (North Carolina)
 Spring Hope station
 Stedman station
 Tabor City station
 Tillery station
 Wade station
 Wallace station (North Carolina)
 Washington station (North Carolina)
 Weldon station (North Carolina)
 Whichard station
 Whitakers station
 Whiteville station (North Carolina)
 Willard station (North Carolina)
 Wilson (Amtrak station)

South Carolina
 Bonneau station
 Cades station
 Cameron station (South Carolina)
 Charleston, South Carolina (Amtrak station)
 Clio station (South Carolina)
 Conway station (South Carolina), listed on the NRHP in South Carolina
 Cope station (South Carolina)
 Darlington station (South Carolina)
 Denmark (Amtrak station)
 Dillon (Amtrak station)
 Effingham station (South Carolina)
 Ehrhardt station
 Elloree station
 Eutawville station
 Atlantic Coast Line Depot (Florence, South Carolina), listed on the NRHP in South Carolina
 Hartsville station (South Carolina)
 Holly Hill station
 Kingstree (Amtrak station)
 Lake City station (South Carolina)
 Lamar station (South Carolina)
 Latta station
 Loris station
 Marion station (South Carolina)
 Mayesville station
 Moncks Corner station
 Mullins station
 Myrtle Beach Atlantic Coast Line Railroad Station, listed on the NRHP in South Carolina
 Pinewood Depot
 Pee Dee station
 Ravenel station
 Salters station
 St. Stephens station
 Tatum station
 Timmonsville station
 Walterboro station
 White Hall station (South Carolina)
 Yemassee (Amtrak station)

Virginia
 Emporia station (Virginia)
 Petersburg (Amtrak station), Ettrick
 Norfolk station (Virginia)
 Junction of Richmond and Petersburg Railroad and Tidewater and Western Railroad which is now defunct.

References

Atlantic Coast Line Railroad